"I Wonder Where My Easy Rider's Gone?" is a ragtime/blues song written by Shelton Brooks in 1913. Sometimes categorized as hokum, it led to an answer song written in 1915 by W.C. Handy, "Yellow Dog Rag", later titled "Yellow Dog Blues". Lines and melody from both songs show up in the 1920s and 1930s in such songs as "E. Z. Rider", "See See Rider", "C. C. Rider", and "Easy Rider Blues".

"I Wonder Where My Easy Rider's Gone?"
Written for the vaudeville stage, the lyrics tell of a Susie Johnson who bets on a horse race using a tip from Jockey Lee, who subsequently runs off with her money.

First verse:

Chorus:

"I Wonder Where My Easy Rider's Gone?" was first popularized on the vaudeville stage by Sophie Tucker. It is most noted for its performance in a 1933 movie, She Done Him Wrong, in which Mae West sang it in a suggestive manner. It is perhaps this performance which gave it its hokum reputation.

"Yellow Dog Rag"/"Yellow Dog Blues"

In 1915, W.C. Handy wrote an answer song to "I Wonder Where My Easy Rider's Gone?" which he called "Yellow Dog Rag." "Yellow Dog Rag" sold poorly. In 1919, he retitled it "Yellow Dog Blues" to take advantage of the popularity of blues, after which it sold moderately well. His song explains what became of Jockey Lee.

The version quoted is how Bessie Smith sang it in her well-known 1925 recording:

First verse:

Chorus:
{{poemquote|Miss Sue your Easy Rider struck this burg today
On a southboun' rattler side door Pullman car (2)
Seen him here an' he was on the hog
Miss Sue your easy rider got to stay away
So he had to vamp it but the hike ain't far
He's gone where the Southern cross' the Yellow Dog
Dear Sue your, etc.}}

(1) (Rural Free Delivery or RFD as it was popularly called was a service by the post office to deliver mail                 directly to rural farm families)

(2) a "side door Pullman car" was hobo slang for a box car with the cargo door open which made it easy to "bum" a ride.

The "Yellow Dog" was the local name for the Yazoo Delta Railroad; the "Southern" is the much larger Southern Railway.

"Yellow Dog Blues" has been recorded a number of times, mostly as an instrumental, and has become a traditional  jazz standard.
Berl Olswanger and the Berl Olswanger Orchestra included its instrumental version on their album Berl Olswanger Orchestra with the Olswanger Beat (1964).

See also
See See Rider
Yazoo and Mississippi Valley Railroad
List of train songs

References

Bibliography
Louvish, Simon. Mae West: It Ain't No Sin. St. Martin's Griffin (2007).
Rubin, Louis Decimus. Where the Southern Cross the Yellow Dog: On Writers and Writing.  University of Missouri Press (2005).
Wald, Elijah. Escaping the Delta: Robert Johnson and the Invention of the Blues. Harper Collins (2004)
Wintz, Cary D.; Finkelman, Paul. Encyclopedia of the Harlem Renaissance''. Routledge (2004).

Rags
Blues songs
Jazz songs
Bessie Smith songs
Liza Minnelli songs
Songs written by Shelton Brooks
Yazoo and Mississippi Valley Railroad
1913 songs